Death Rides the Plains is a 1943 American Western film directed by Sam Newfield and written by Joseph O'Donnell. The film stars Robert Livingston as the Lone Rider and Al St. John as his sidekick "Fuzzy Jones", with Patti McCarty, Ray Bennett, I. Stanford Jolley and George Chesebro. The film was released on May 7, 1943, by Producers Releasing Corporation.

This is the fourteenth movie in the "Lone Rider" series, and the third starring Robert Livingston. The first eleven movies star George Houston.

Plot
A gang of crooks is repeatedly selling the Circle C Ranch, and then murdering the buyers before they take possession of the land. Fuzzy's cousin Luke falls victim to the scheme, and the Lone Rider disguises himself as an outlaw to bring the schemers to justice.

Cast          
Robert Livingston as Rocky Cameron, the Lone Rider
Al St. John as Fuzzy Jones 
Patti McCarty as Virginia Marshall
Ray Bennett as Ben Gowdey
I. Stanford Jolley as Rogan
George Chesebro as Trent
John Elliott as James Marshall
Kermit Maynard as Jed
Slim Whitaker as Sheriff
Karl Hackett as Edward Simms

See also
The "Lone Rider" films starring George Houston:
 The Lone Rider Rides On (1941)
 The Lone Rider Crosses the Rio (1941)
 The Lone Rider in Ghost Town (1941)
 The Lone Rider in Frontier Fury (1941)
 The Lone Rider Ambushed (1941)
 The Lone Rider Fights Back (1941)
 The Lone Rider and the Bandit (1942)
 The Lone Rider in Cheyenne (1942)
 The Lone Rider in Texas Justice (1942)
 Border Roundup (1942)
 Outlaws of Boulder Pass (1942)
starring Robert Livingston: 
 Overland Stagecoach (1942)
 Wild Horse Rustlers (1943)
 Death Rides the Plains (1943)
 Wolves of the Range (1943)
 Law of the Saddle (1943)
 Raiders of Red Gap (1943)

References

External links
 

1943 films
American Western (genre) films
1943 Western (genre) films
Producers Releasing Corporation films
Films directed by Sam Newfield
American black-and-white films
1940s English-language films
1940s American films